Aroma Dutta (born 20 July 1950) is a Bangladeshi social and human rights activist. In February 2019, she was nominated by the ruling party, Bangladesh Awami League, to a seat reserved for women in the 11th parliament of Jatiya Sangsad.

Early life
Dutta's grandfather, Dhirendranath Datta, a member of the National Assembly of Pakistan and the first person to demand Bengali be made a state language in Pakistan. He was killed in the Bangladesh Liberation war by members of the Pakistan army and is considered a martyr in Bangladesh. Aroma's father, Sanjib Datta, was a journalist who worked in the Pakistan Observer. Her ancestral home in Brahmanbaria was taken over by Muslims after the Bangladesh Liberation war through the use of the vested property act. She has tried to get it back through the local courts but has failed to do so. She served in the National Human Rights Commission of Bangladesh. Her uncle was the filmmaker Ritwik Kumar Ghatak.

Career
Dutta is an executive director of PRIP (Private Rural Initiatives Program) Trust. In 2012, she criticised the draft Hindu Marriage Registration Act for making the registration of Hindu marriage optional and called for it to be made mandatory. She has protested violence against minorities in Bangladesh and called for punishment for attackers involved in violence against Buddhists in Cox's Bazar. She has spoken against the vested property act, that unfairly targets religious minorities. She has expressed  the only way to protect minorities in Bangladesh is through the proper implementation of laws in the country.

Awards and honors
In 2016, Dutta was awarded the Begum Rokeya Padak by the Government of Bangladesh. She has called for security forces to be deployed in vulnerable election areas for elections to take place. In May 2017, she received the Danbir Ranada Prasad Memorial Honour and Gold Medal by the Kumudini Welfare Trust of Bengal, on behalf of her father. She has called on the government to provide social security to Dalits, low caste Hindus, and other marginalised communities at a roundtable discussion in Dhaka.

References

Living people
1950 births
Bangladeshi women activists
Bangladeshi women scholars
Bangladeshi human rights activists
Recipients of Begum Rokeya Padak
11th Jatiya Sangsad members
21st-century Bangladeshi women politicians
Women members of the Jatiya Sangsad
Bangladeshi Hindus
Place of birth missing (living people)